The Collective Action Party – Civic Congress is a left-wing and Eurosceptic political party in the Republic of Moldova. In the program documents of the Civil Congress, it is noted that the purpose of creating a party is to change the system of public relations, in which the economy will be completely subordinated to human development. The declared political values of the party are social justice, solidarity, humanism, scientific outlook and critical analysis. The party is also Eurosceptic, anti-Western, pro-Russian and opposes the unification of Moldova with Romania. The Civil Congress confirmed in the party charter the absence of the position of the party chairman, which is classical for political parties, and the principle of collective leadership of a political formation.

Some political scientists have attributed the Civil Congress with being part of the so-called new generation of European left parties, aimed at replacing the old left: communists and social democrats. According to various estimates, the closeness of the program theses and the organizational structure of the Civil Congress is most similar to the following political formations: Podemos (Spain), SYRIZA (Greece), La France Insoumise, Razem (Poland), the left wing of the Labour Party (UK) and the ideological wing of Bernie Sanders in the US Democratic Party. However, the Romanian newspaper Adevărul stated that the party was formed by former members of the radical wing of the Party of Communists, labeling it as anti-Romanian.

The prerequisite for the creation of the Civil Congress was the so-called 2019 Moldovan constitutional crisis. After the events of 7–15 June 2019 in Moldova, the initiative group decided on the need to create a political party.

On 31 July 2019, the political program of the party was presented and submitted for public discussion. The document provoked discussion on social networks and the media of Moldova, and the creation of the Civic Congress itself was commented on, including by foreign media.

On 22 September 2019, in the House of Culture of the city of Drochia, a regional forum of initiative groups of the Civil Congress of the Northern Regions of Moldova was held. On 17 November 2019, the founding conference of the Chișinău organization of the Civil Congress was held.

On 8 December 2019, the Constituent Congress of the new political formation was held. The Manifesto and the Charter were adopted, as well as the Action Plan "Moldova 2020–2025".

On 13 January 2020, the Collective Action Party – Civil Congress was registered with the Public Services Agency of the Republic of Moldova.

References

2019 establishments in Moldova
Democratic socialist parties in Europe
Eurosceptic parties in Moldova
Political parties established in 2019
Political parties in Moldova
Progressive parties
Russian political parties in Moldova
Socialist parties in Moldova